Tante Pose is a 1940 Norwegian film, directed by Leif Sinding, based on the book by Norwegian author Gabriel Scott.

It stars Henny Skjønberg in the title role.

Synopsis
The Christmas preparations are underway at the wealthy Bals family farm. Everyone is busy getting ready for days of season celebrations when a message arrives that puts an immediate damper on the festivities; Magistrate Bals' cranky old sister - nicknamed "tante Pose" (direct translation: auntie bag) - has announced her arrival at the farm. The aunt and old grandpa Bals can't stand each other and from the moment she shows her face there is a state of war between the two, seriously complicating the family celebrations.

The movie was a huge hit in Norwegian movie-theaters in 1940 and has since grown to become a staple of Norwegian Christmas traditions, being shown on television every Christmas.

External links

1940 films
1940s Norwegian-language films
Norwegian black-and-white films
1940 comedy films
Norwegian Christmas films
Films based on Norwegian novels
Norwegian comedy films
Films directed by Leif Sinding